Cephalorhyncha is a genus of kinorhynchs in the family Echinoderidae.

Species
Cephalorhyncha asiatica (Adrianov, 1989)
Cephalorhyncha liticola Sørensen, 2008
Cephalorhyncha nybakkeni (Higgins, 1986)

References

Kinorhyncha
Ecdysozoa genera